Geeft ons kracht is a 1920 Dutch silent film directed by Theo Frenkel.

Cast
 Co Balfoort
 Esther De Boer-van Rijk
 Vera van Haeften
 Nola Hatterman
 Joop van Hulzen
 Dio Huysmans
 Wilhelmina Schwab-Welman

External links 
 

1920 films
Dutch black-and-white films
Films directed by Theo Frenkel
Dutch silent films